John Harold Haydel (July 9, 1944 - September 12, 2018) was an American professional baseball player who was a pitcher in Major League Baseball (MLB). Haydel signed with the Milwaukee Braves as a free agent in 1962. Later that year, he was drafted in the First-Year player draft by the Houston Colt .45s. The following year, he was traded along with Dick LeMay and Merritt Ranew to the Chicago Cubs for Dave Gerard and Danny Murphy. In 1966, Haydel was selected in the Minor League Draft by the San Francisco Giants. Three years later, he was drafted in the Rule 5 draft by the Minnesota Twins. During his time with the Twins, Haydel played at the Major League level in 1970 and 1971.

Haydel died September 12, 2018.

References

Sportspeople from Houma, Louisiana
Minnesota Twins players
Major League Baseball pitchers
2018 deaths
1944 births
Baseball players from Louisiana
Arizona Instructional League Cubs players
Arizona Instructional League Giants players
Dallas–Fort Worth Spurs players
Dublin Braves players
Evansville Triplets players
Phoenix Giants players
Portland Beavers players
St. Cloud Rox players
Tacoma Twins players
Wenatchee Chiefs players
Burials in Louisiana